"Bumpy Ride" is a soca song by Swedish-Congolese R&B singer-songwriter Mohombi from his debut studio album, MoveMeant (2011). It was released as his debut single in the United States on 24 August 2010. Written by RedOne, Bilal "The Chef" Hajji, AJ Junior, and Mohombi, and produced by RedOne, it is the first release on RedOne's label 2101 Records, a joint venture with Universal Music. He also released a popular bilingual French/English version for the Francophone markets. The song became a number-one hit in The Netherlands, and a top ten hit in Belgium, Czech Republic, Denmark, Finland, France, Norway, Poland, Slovakia, and Sweden.

Critical reception
Paul Lester of The Guardian described the song as a "popped-up dancehall affair wherein Mohombi promises to 'rock' the female subject of his affections 'like a rodeo'."

Track listing
US digital download
"Bumpy Ride" – 3:44

German digital download
"Bumpy Ride" – 3:45
"Bumpy Ride" (Chuckie Remix) – 6:23

French digital download
"Bumpy Ride" – 3:45
"Bumpy Ride" (French Version) – 3:45

Personnel
Songwriting – RedOne, Bilal "The Chef" Hajji, AJ Junior, Mohombi
Production, instruments, programming and vocal arrangement – RedOne
Recording, engineering and vocal editing – RedOne, Trevor Muzzy
Backing vocals – RedOne, Mohombi

Source:

Charts and certifications

Weekly charts

Year-end charts

Certifications

Release history

References

External links

Dutch Top 40 number-one singles
Mohombi songs
Song recordings produced by RedOne
Songs written by RedOne
Songs written by Bilal Hajji
2010 debut singles
2010 songs
2101 Records singles
Island Records singles
Interscope Records singles
Songs written by AJ Junior
Songs written by Ilya Salmanzadeh
Songs written by Mohombi
2010 singles